Lev Philippovitch Wolkenstein (1858—20.05.1935, Paris) was a Russian jurist, lawyer and cadet.

Life 
He was born as Isaak-Leib Fishelevich Wolkenstein in 1858, presumably in Taganrog. Lev Wolkenstein studied at Taganrog Classical Male Gymnasium at the same time as Anton Chekhov. When Chekhov was in seventh grade and Wolkenstein was in undergraduate eighth grade, all of the students in Wolkenstein's class except him refused to write an essay prescribed for them. This caused conflict between Wolkenstein and his classmates. One of them called Wolkenstein as "zhyd" and Wolkenstein slapped him in the face. For this assault and battery, Wolkenstein was expelled from gymnasium. After that, Chekhov induced classmates to write a collective statement that all of them would leave the gymnasium if Wolkenstein was not reinstated. That had an effect, and he was reinstated and later graduated from gymnasium.

Then Wolkenstein studied at faculty of law of Saint Petersburg State University. In 1888 he was a lawyer's assistant and took part in a trial on case of poisoning. Maximenko (Максименко) had been accused of poisoning her husband, but she was acquitted. A famous Russian lawyer  and prison doctor Mark Krasso (Марк Крассо) also took part in that trial.

In 1890 he bought a house in Rostov-on-Don at the corner of Staro-pochtovaya street (now Stanislavskogo street) and Kazansky lane (now Gazetny lane), and made extensive repairs to it. From the mid 1890s Wolkenstein lived in this house with his wife Sofia Efremovna Wolkenstein (?—1940), his daughters (Alisa and Olga) and his young son Yuri/Georg Wolkenstein (1892—?), who later became a lawyer in Paris.

Chekhov visited Wolkenstein at his home, and may have talked with him about the staging of Chekhov's plays in the theatres of Rostov-on-Don. According to Chekhov, at 1896 Wolkenstein also had a dacha in Kislovodsk.

Wolkenstein was able to lease some of the rooms in his Rostov-on-Don house, which became a revenue house. The  building still exists today, and is considered a regional architectural monument.

Wolkenstein and Chekhov were both active in the theatrical world. In 1910 Asmolov sold this theatre to Lev Wolkenstein and Iosif Moiseevich Fain. Wolkenstein had been writing scripts for several theatrical performances, for example, the vaudeville Hussars and Doves. At this time he was also working as a lawyer for the  newspaper.

Later Wolkenstein emigrated from Russia. He spent the last years of his life in Paris and wrote for Illustrated Russia magazine. In 1934, he published his own memories of Anton Chekhov in the magazine.

On 20 May 1935, Lev Wolkenstein died in Paris. His widow Sofia Efremovna Wolkenstein lived several years more, and then on 4 January 1940 she died in Vulaines and was buried at Nouveau Cimetiere de Neuilly. Lev's son, George Wolkenstein, was the founder of the French branch of the family: Alexis Wolkenstein, his son; Pierre Wolkenstein and Marie-Sophie Wolkenstein, his grand children; and Paul, Louis, Héloïse and Simon Wolkenstein, his great grand children living in Paris.

Gallery

References

Bibliography 
 
 
 
 
 
 

Lawyers from the Russian Empire
19th-century lawyers from the Russian Empire
20th-century Russian lawyers
1858 births
1935 deaths